E310 may refer to:
 Toshiba e310
 Propyl gallate E number E310
 a Dell Dimension E series computer model